Vladimir Alexandrovich Alikin (born 10 May 1957) is a Soviet former biathlete.

Life and career
Alikin was born in the village of Dolgy Mot near the settlement of Novoilyinsky in the Nytvensky District of the Perm Oblast. He began cross-country skiing in 1969 at Children and Youth Sport School and biathlon - in 1977. From 1979 he trained at the Armed Forces sports society in Moscow. At the 1980 Olympics in Lake Placid, New York Alikin won a gold medal with the USSR relay team and he also won a silver medal in the sprint event. In the World Championships he has four medals: bronze in 10 km sprint in 1982, and three relay bronze medals in 1979, 1981, and 1982. He also won the 1980 Biathlon World Cup in 10 km sprint and USSR Championships in the same event.

Biathlon results
All results are sourced from the International Biathlon Union.

Olympic Games
2 medals (1 gold, 1 silver)

World Championships
4 medals (4 bronze)

*During Olympic seasons competitions are only held for those events not included in the Olympic program.

Individual victories
1 victory (1 In)

*Results are from UIPMB and IBU races which include the Biathlon World Cup, Biathlon World Championships and the Winter Olympic Games.

References

External links
 
 
 

1957 births
Living people
Soviet male biathletes
Biathletes at the 1980 Winter Olympics
Olympic biathletes of the Soviet Union
Medalists at the 1980 Winter Olympics
Olympic medalists in biathlon
Olympic silver medalists for the Soviet Union
Olympic gold medalists for the Soviet Union
Biathlon World Championships medalists